Albert Seaton Berry (May 13, 1836 – January 6, 1908) was a U.S. Representative from Kentucky.

Biography 
Born in Fairfield (now Dayton), Campbell County, Kentucky, Berry attended the public schools.  He graduated from Miami University, Oxford, Ohio, in 1855 and from the Cincinnati Law School in 1858.  He was admitted to the bar and practiced law.  He served as prosecuting attorney of Newport, Kentucky, in 1859.
He served in the Confederate States Marine Corps throughout the Civil War.  He served five terms as mayor of Newport, beginning in 1870.  He served as member of the Kentucky Senate in 1878 and 1884.

Berry was elected as a Democrat to the Fifty-third and to the three succeeding Congresses (March 4, 1893 – March 3, 1901).  He was an unsuccessful candidate for renomination in 1900.

He resumed the practice of law.  He was appointed and subsequently elected judge of the seventeenth judicial district of Kentucky and served from 1905 until his death in Newport, Kentucky, January 6, 1908.  He was interred in Evergreen Cemetery.

References 
  Retrieved on 2009-05-07
 

1836 births
1908 deaths
American prosecutors
Confederate States Marine Corps officers
Kentucky state court judges
Democratic Party Kentucky state senators
Mayors of places in Kentucky
Miami University alumni
People from Dayton, Kentucky
People of Kentucky in the American Civil War
University of Cincinnati College of Law alumni
Democratic Party members of the United States House of Representatives from Kentucky
19th-century American politicians
19th-century American judges